Robert, Bob, or Bobby Franklin may refer to:

Robert Michael Franklin Jr. (born 1954), president of Morehouse College
Robert Franklin (divine) (1630–1684), English nonconformist divine
Bobby Franklin (1957–2011), Georgia state legislator
Bobby Franklin (American football) (born 1936), former American football safety for the Cleveland Browns
Bob Franklin (Australian footballer) (1886–1959), Australian rules footballer who played with South Melbourne 
Bob Franklin (comedian) (born 1965), British comedian who has lived in Australia since 1989

See also